Ivan Ćosić (born 23 May 1986) is a former Croatian handballer.

Honours

RK Zamet II
3. HRL - West
Winner (1): 2004-05

Sandefjord
1. Division
Promotion (1): 2010-11

RK Zamet
Croatian Cup
Finalist (1): 2012

References

External links
 Ivan Ćosić in European competitions
 Ivan Ćosić Premier League stats

1986 births
Living people
Croatian male handball players
Handball players from Rijeka
RK Zamet players
Expatriate handball players
Croatian expatriate sportspeople in Norway
Croatian expatriate sportspeople in Germany